Apaturopsis kilusa is a butterfly in the family Nymphalidae. It is found in north-western Madagascar. The habitat consists of forests.

References

Butterflies described in 1891
Apaturinae
Butterflies of Africa